Lisa Goldstein (born Elizabeth Joy Goldstein on November 21, 1953) is an American fantasy and science fiction writer whose work has been nominated for Nebula, Hugo, and World Fantasy Awards.  Her 1982 novel The Red Magician won a National Book Award in the one-year category Original Paperback

and was praised by Philip K. Dick shortly before his death. Her 2011 novel, The Uncertain Places, won the 2012 Mythopoeic Fantasy Award for Adult Literature, and her short story, "Paradise Is a Walled Garden," won the 2011 Sidewise Award for Best Short-Form Alternate History.

Biography
Goldstein's father was Heinz Jurgen "Harry" Goldstein (born June 8, 1922 in Krefeld, Germany; died May 24, 1974 in Los Angeles), a survivor of Bergen-Belsen concentration camp; her mother, Miriam Roth (born April 8, 1922 in Mukachevo, Czechoslovakia; died October 12, 2011 in Los Angeles), survived the extermination camp Auschwitz. Her parents came to the United States in 1947 and met in an ESL class.

She has written two high fantasy novels, Daughter of Exile and The Divided Crown, under the pen name "Isabel Glass". Her publisher recommended a pseudonym because they differ so much from her other work. "Isabel" is from Point Isabel Regional Shoreline, a local park which includes a dog run. "Glass" fits the Tor Books standard for pseudonyms, short surnames in the first half of the alphabet.

She married Douglas A. Asherman in 1986, and lives in Oakland, California.

Bibliography

Novels

 The Red Magician (1982)
 The Dream Years (1985)
 A Mask for the General (1987)
 Tourists (1989)
 Strange Devices of the Sun and Moon (1993)
 Summer King, Winter Fool (1994)
 Walking the Labyrinth (1996)
 Dark Cities Underground (1999)
 The Alchemist's Door (2002)
 Daughter of Exile (as Isabel Glass; 2004)
 The Divided Crown (illustrated by Kinuko Y. Craft) (as Isabel Glass; 2005)
 The Uncertain Places (2011)
 Weighing Shadows (2015)
Ivory Apples (2019)

Collections

 Daily Voices (1989)
 Travellers in Magic (1994)

Awards

 National Book Award (1983) for The Red Magician
 Sidewise Award for Alternate History (2011) for "Paradise is a Walled Garden"
 Mythopoeic Fantasy Award for Adult Literature (2012) for Uncertain Places

Nominations
 John W. Campbell Award for Best New Writer finalist (1983) for The Red Magician
 John W. Campbell Award for Best New Writer finalist (1984) for The Red Magician
 World Fantasy Award for Best Novel nominee (1986) for The Dream Years
 Hugo Award for Best Short Story nominee (1988) for "Cassandra's Photographs"
 Nebula Award for Best Short Story nominee (1988) for "Cassandra's Photographs"
 Arthur C. Clarke Award nominee (1990) for A Mask for the General
 World Fantasy Award for Best Short Story nominee (1993) for "Alfred"
 Nebula Award for Best Short Story nominee (1994) for "Alfred"
 World Fantasy Award for Best Collection nominee (1995) for Travellers In Magic
 Nebula Award for Best Short Story nominee (1996) for "The Narcissus Plague"
 World Fantasy Award for Best Short Story nominee (1998) for "Fortune and Misfortune"
 Nebula Award for Best Short Story nominee (1999) for "Fortune and Misfortune"

 Mythopoeic Fantasy Award for Adult Literature nominee (2000) for Dark Cities Underground
 Nebula Award for Best Novelette nominee (2009) for "Dark Rooms"

See also
 List of San Francisco Bay Area writers

References

External links

 
 Interview: Lisa Goldstein by Lori Ann White, 28 July 2003, at Strange Horizons
 2012 Mythopoeic Awards
 2011 Sidewise Awards
 Lisa Goldstein at Library of Congress Authorities — with 12 catalog records
 Isabel Glass at LC Authorities

1953 births
Living people
20th-century American novelists
21st-century American novelists
20th-century American women writers
21st-century American women writers
American fantasy writers
American science fiction writers
Jewish American novelists
National Book Award winners
Sidewise Award winners
Women science fiction and fantasy writers
Writers from Oakland, California
21st-century American Jews